Breard v. City of Alexandria, 341 U.S. 622 (1951), was a United States Supreme Court case, and the Court held that door-to-door solicitation could be restricted without violating the First Amendment or the Dormant Commerce Clause.

Background
Jack H. Breard was a regional representative for Keystone Readers Services, Inc. Breard was arrested for going door-to-door in the City of Alexandria, Louisiana soliciting magazine subscriptions. Breard was arrested for violating an ordinance that required him to get permission from the owners of the residences where he was soliciting.

Opinion of the Court
The case went all the way to the Supreme Court, which ruled the Breard's First Amendment Rights were not violated and that door-to-door solicitation could be restricted without unduly interfering with interstate commerce, and without violating Due Process. The court also held that this ordinance did not violate the Dormant Commerce Clause.

In a dissenting opinion, Justice Black held that the decision went against recent doctrine. Vinson and Douglas wrote another dissenting opinion, calling the ordinance "flat prohibition" and arguing that it discriminated against interstate commerce because it made an exception for local farm products.

References

External links
 

United States Supreme Court cases
1951 in United States case law
Alexandria, Louisiana
United States Supreme Court cases of the Vinson Court